Pedicularis sudetica, common names of which are fernweed, Sudeten lousewort, Sedetic lousewort, and Sudetic lousewort is a species of flowering plant in the family Orobanchaceae which is native to Poland, the former Czechoslovakia, and northern Russia to the Urals, but can now be found in such US states as Alaska, Colorado, New Mexico, Wyoming, and Canada since it was introduced there. The plant is both  perennial and bisexual.

References

sudetica
Flora of Czechoslovakia
Flora of Poland
Flora of North European Russia 
Flora of East European Russia